is a passenger railway station located in the town of Kamisato, Saitama, Japan, operated by the East Japan Railway Company (JR East).

Lines
Jimbohara Station is served by the Takasaki Line, with through Shōnan-Shinjuku Line and Ueno-Tokyo Line services to and from the Tōkaidō Main Line.

Layout
The station has one side platform and one island platform serving three tracks, connected by a footbridge, with a single-story station building. The station is staffed.

Platforms

History 
Jimbohara Station opened on 15 November 1897. The station became part of the JR East network after the privatization of the JNR on 1 April 1987.

Passenger statistics
In fiscal 2019, the station was used by an average of 2799 passengers daily (boarding passengers only).

Surrounding area
Kamisato Town Hall
Kamisato Post Office

See also
List of railway stations in Japan

References

External links

JR East Jimbohara Station

Railway stations in Saitama Prefecture
Railway stations in Japan opened in 1897
Takasaki Line
Stations of East Japan Railway Company
Shōnan-Shinjuku Line
Kamisato, Saitama